The Hon. Charles Wentworth George Howard (27 March 1814 – 11 April 1879) was a long-standing Whig (and then Liberal) British Member of Parliament.

Early life
Howard was the fifth son of George Howard, 6th Earl of Carlisle, and his wife Lady Georgiana Dorothy, daughter of William Cavendish, 5th Duke of Devonshire. Among his siblings was older brothers, George Howard, 7th Earl of Carlisle, and the Rev. William George Howard, 8th Earl of Carlisle, both of whom died unmarried and without legitimate issue.

Career
He was elected to the House of Commons as one of two representatives for Cumberland East at a by-election in 1840, a seat he held until his death in 1879.  During his lengthy tenure, he served alongside William James from 1840 to 1847, William Marshall from 1847 to 1868, William Nicholson Hodgson from 1868 to 1876, and Stafford Howard from 1876 to 1879.

Personal life
On 8 August 1842, he was married to Mary Priscilla Harriet Parke (1822–1843), daughter of James Parke, 1st Baron Wensleydale, in 1842. She died on 26 August 1843, only two weeks after the birth of their son and only child:
 George James Howard (1843–1911), who succeeded him as Member of Parliament for Cumberland East and in 1889 also succeeded his uncle as ninth Earl of Carlisle. In 1864, he married Hon. Rosalind Frances Stanley, fifth daughter of Edward Stanley, 2nd Baron Stanley of Alderley, with whom he had eleven children.

Howard survived her by 36 years and died in April 1879, aged 65 at Holker House, the Lancashire seat of the Duke of Devonshire, Howard's brother-in-law through his late sister Lady Blanche Georgiana Howard.

Memorial
The East Window of the famous Pre-Raphaelite church, St Martin's in Brampton, Cumbria was installed as the County Memorial to Howard.  Designed by Edward Burne-Jones, it depicts Christ the Good Shepherd and four saints: Martin, the patron of the church; Mary, the Virgin; Dorothy, and George.

References

External links
 
 

1814 births
1879 deaths
Younger sons of earls
Charles Howard
Liberal Party (UK) MPs for English constituencies
UK MPs 1837–1841
UK MPs 1841–1847
UK MPs 1847–1852
UK MPs 1852–1857
UK MPs 1857–1859
UK MPs 1859–1865
UK MPs 1865–1868
UK MPs 1868–1874
UK MPs 1874–1880
Whig (British political party) MPs for English constituencies